O.P. Jindal Global (Institution of Eminence Deemed to be University), is a private university located at Sonipat in Haryana. It was established in 2009 as a philanthropic initiative of its founding chancellor, Naveen Jindal in memory of his father, O.P. Jindal. In 2020, UGC named JGU as an Institute of Eminence, making it one of the ten private universities in India to have received the distinction. The university offers 45 programmes in law, liberal arts, life sciences and business.

Constituent colleges 
The university consists of twelve schools:
 Jindal Global Law School (JGLS)
 Jindal Global Business School (JGBS)
 Jindal School of International Affairs (JSIA)
 Jindal School of Government and Public Policy (JSGP)
 Jindal School of Liberal Arts & Humanities (JSLH)
 Jindal School of Journalism & Communication (JSJC)
 Jindal School of Banking and Finance (JSBF)
Jindal School of Art & Architecture (JSAA)
 Jindal School of Environment and Sustainability (JSES)
 Jindal School of Psychology and Counselling (JSPC)
Jindal School of Public Health and Human Development (JSPH)
Jindal School of Languages and Literature (JSLL)
International Institute for Higher Education Research & Capacity Building (IIHed) - http://iihed.edu.in/

Research Centres 

 Jindal Centre for Social Innovation & Entrepreneurship
 Centre for Security Studies
Centre for Health, Law, Ethics, and Technology
 Centre For Middle East Studies
 Centre for Israel Studies
 Centre for Latin American and Caribbean Studies
 Centre for Public Law & Jurisprudence
 Centre for India-China Studies
 Centre for Comparative and Global Education 
 Centre for New Economics Studies
 Jindal Centre for Global South
 Mahatma Gandhi Centre for Peace Studies

Rankings 
The university was ranked 751–800 in the QS World Rankings 2020, making it the youngest university to break into the rankings. JGLS, and National Law School of India, Bangalore, were the only two Indian law schools to make it into the rankings.
In the QS World University Rankings 2021 Edition, JGU was ranked in the top 651-700 universities across the world. This placed JGU as the highest ranked private university in India. As a result of having been instituted in 2009, JGU was also ranked in the QS Top 150 under 50 Rankings in 2020 as well as 2021. 
Jindal law school ranked 76 out of all law schools globally in the QS World Rankings 2021.

The university was again ranked as the number 1 private university in India in QS World Rankings 2022. The university has also been granted the status of Institute of Eminence by the Government of India in 2020.

In 2017, the university was also termed the cleanest campus in India by Swachhta Ranking 2017. In 2021, JGU was also ranked amongst the top 500 in the world in the QS Graduate Employability Rankings 2022.

Notable faculty 
The university is distinguished to have many respectable faculty members, and has also signed MoUs with universities abroad for faculty exchange and collaboration. The university is considered to be one of the "few 'elite' non-profit universities" besides Ashoka University and Indian School of Business to attract the best faculty.

Some of the noted faculty members include:

Justice Uday Umesh Lalit, former Chief Justice of India
 Justice (Retd.) Swatanter Kumar, former judge of the Supreme Court of India.
Padma Shri Upendra Baxi, former vice-chancellor of University of Delhi.
 B. S. Chimni, former vice-chancellor of the West Bengal National University of Juridical Sciences.
 Mahendra Pal Singh, former vice-chancellor of the West Bengal National University of Juridical Sciences and revising author of V.N. Shukla's "Constitution of India".
 Shiv Visvanathan
 Ramin Jahanbegloo
Guðmundur Eiríksson, former member of United Nations International Law Commission and judge, International Tribunal for the Law of the Sea.
 Armin Rosencranz
Flavia Agnes (visiting faculty)
Vesselin Popovski, former diplomat.
Gagan Kumar Kwatra, former head of Indian Council of Arbitration.
Michael C. Davis
Kishalay Bhattacharjee senior journalist, former resident editor of NDTV and recipient Ramnath Goenka Excellence in Journalism Awards 
Venu Rajamony Diplomat and former press secretary to the President of India 
R. K. Raghavan, Former director of Central Bureau of Investigation 
 Ashish Khetan
 Archie Parnell , American attorney and politician 
 Stephen P. Marks
 Hartosh Singh Bal 
 Josy Joseph
 Sandeep Dikshit 
 A. K. Singh
 Sabrina McKenna, honorary adjunct professor 
Dalveer Bhandari 
R. Venkataramani
Abhishek Singhvi
Michael Kirby (judge)
 C. Raj Kumar

Student Initiatives 
The university has a healthy culture of student engagement and student-led initiatives. This includes an active social service society, legal aid clinic, a Rotaract club, and several cultural societies. The university also hosts two annual festivals: cultural festival Biswamil in the fall semester and sports festival Magnus in the spring semester.

Legal Aid Clinic 
The university has a fully student-led legal aid clinic and gets frequent attention for its impact and initiatives. In 2017, the Clinic won the prestigious Herbert Smith Freehills' Community Engagement Award. A legal news website noted that the "student run initiative offers legal counselling services, awareness building sessions and assistance in filing PILs. They will also receive a £2,000 cash prize as part of the award." In 2017, the Clinic's student board members and law students Shivkrit Rai and Nipun Arora exposed an admissions scam at the National School of Drama, Delhi, which also helped the Clinic bag the award.

Right to Education Litigation 
in 2017, a writ petition was filed by the faculty-director of the Clinic before the Allahabad High Court, which led to the landmark decision of Sudheer Kumar v. State of U.P., ruling that even unaided private schools are covered under the Right to Education Act, and for wrongful denial of admission, the school ought to cover cost of education till graduation. In July 2020, the Legal Aid Clinic took up the case of a child who was denied admission by Modern School, Delhi under the EWS quota as per Right to Education Act. The Clinic filed a writ petition through alumnus & advocate Nipun Arora and secured a favourable order for the child.

Human Rights Representations 
The Clinic made complaints against police brutality during CAA protests in Delhi and Uttar Pradesh and also made representations to the NHRC. In April 2020, during the national lockdown due to the COVID-19 pandemic, the Clinic made a representation to the Home Secretary to exempt the protection officers under the Domestic Violence Act. The Clinic also wrote to the union law minister when three environment-advocacy websites were banned in India.

Moot Court Society 
The university has a student-run society for moot court competitions and regularly participate in national and international competitions. The society won Oxford Price Media Moot 2014, won Phillip C Jessup International Moot's India rounds in 2015, runners-up in Willem C Vis International Commercial Arbitration moot in Vienna in 2017, World Finalist in 16th Willem C Vis International Commercial Arbitration Moot in Hong Kong in 2019, and runner-up in Phillip C. Jessup International Moot Competition in 2020 and declared the 2nd best speaker (India rounds).

Competitions Hosted & Organised 
The JGLS moot court society organised the JIRICO Law & Technology Moot Competition (2016), 7th Indian Vis Pre-Moot Competition, Stetson Moot Competition (India Rounds - 2018) and hosted the Stetson International Environmental Moot Court Competition.

Notable alumni

 Thomas George Karimpanal, sport shooter
Arman Sood, founder of Sleepy Owl Coffee, named in Forbes 30 under 30

Blended Learning 
The Jindal Global Business School and Jindal School of Banking & Finance offers MBA degree in Digital Finance and Banking through a blended learning mode through their partnership with ed-tech startup upGrad.

See also 
 List of institutions of higher education in Haryana
 List of think tanks in India

References

External links 
 

Institutes of Eminence
Universities in Haryana
Sonipat
Private universities in India
Educational institutions established in 2009
2009 establishments in Haryana